Hokkaido Speed Park was a 0.868mile (1.389 km) motor racing circuit in 155 Tougeshita, Kutchan, Abuta District, Shiribeshi Subprefecture, on the island of Hokkaido, Japan. It was closed in 2012.

References

Motorsport venues in Japan
Sports venues in Hokkaido
Sports venues completed in 1985
1985 establishments in Japan
2012 disestablishments in Japan